Malkiya SCC is a Bahraini professional football club based in Malkiya.

Malkiya Club after 49 years, became champion of the Bahraini Premier League in 2017.

Achievements
Bahraini Premier League: 1
 2017

Squad

Continental record

External links
Malkiya Club on soccerway

References

 
Football clubs in Bahrain